Bish Bash is an album by pianist Walter Bishop Jr. that was recorded in 1964 and 1968 and released on the Xanadu label.

Reception

The Allmusic review by Scott Yanow recommended the album awarding it 4 stars and stating: "the two obscure sessions on this Xanadu set were pianist Walter Bishop Jr.'s only dates as a leader during the 1964-70 period... Throughout, Walter Bishop Jr. plays at his most creative, extending the bebop tradition during the enjoyable performances".

Track listing 
All compositions by Walter Bishop Jr. except where noted.
 "Days of Wine and Roses" (Henry Mancini, Johnny Mercer) – 13:43  
 "Willow Weep for Me" (Ann Ronell) – 14:23  
 "Summertime" (George Gershwin, DuBose Heyward) – 3:36  
 "Minor Motive" – 3:36  
 "Yesterday's Dream" – 5:18  
 "Party Time" – 2:00  
 "My Man's Gone Now" (Gershwin, Heyward) – 4:03  
 "Viva" – 2:57

Personnel 
Walter Bishop Jr. – piano
Frank Haynes – tenor saxophone (track 1 & 2)
Eddie Khan (tracks 1-3), Reggie Johnson (tracks 4-8) – bass
Dick Berk (tracks 1-3), Idris Muhammad (tracks 4-8) – drums

References 

Walter Bishop Jr. albums
1975 albums
Xanadu Records albums
Albums produced by Don Schlitten